The Medal "Veteran of Labour" was a civilian labour award of the Soviet Union established on January 18, 1974 by Decree of the Presidium of the Supreme Soviet of the USSR to honour workers for many years of hard work in the national economy, sciences, culture, education, healthcare, government agencies and public organizations.  Although it only had a relatively short eighteen years of existence, it was awarded nearly forty million times.  Its regulations were detailed and approved by decree number 5999-VIII of May 20, 1974.  Its statute was amended by multiple successive decrees of the Presidium of the Supreme Soviet of the USSR, first on June 8, 1977, then on August 12, 1983 and lastly on December 28, 1987.  The medal ceased to be awarded following the December 1991 dissolution of the Soviet Union.

Medal statute
The Medal "Veteran of Labour" was awarded to workers for many years of hard work in the national economy, sciences, culture, education, healthcare, government agencies and public organizations. The medal was awarded to workers, farmers and employees in recognition of their lifelong labour on reaching the seniority required for a long-service pension or retirement age.  Decree of the Presidium of the Supreme Soviet of the USSR number 5822-IX of June 8, 1977 added the rank and file and the officers of the Ministry of Internal Affairs as potential recipients under the same award criteria as the labourers mentioned in the August 12, 1983 decree.

Recommendations for award were made jointly by administrators of Party and trade union organizations, enterprises, institutions and organizations based on nominations from working groups or workforce councils.  The list of potential recipients was then forwarded to municipal, district, or Party and government bodies for final approval.  In the case of members of the Ministry of Internal Affairs, the list of nominations was forwarded to the Minister of Internal Affairs for final approval.

Award ceremonies of the Medal "Veteran of Labour" usually took place in the work place of the recipients and were made on behalf of the Presidium of the Supreme Soviet of the USSR, Presidium of the Supreme Soviet of the Union or of Autonomous Republics, the executive committees of regional and provincial Soviets, Moscow Soviet, Leningrad Soviet, or of the city Soviets of People's Deputies of the capitals of Soviet republics.

The Medal "Veteran of Labour" was worn on the left side of the chest and in the presence of other medals of the USSR, immediately after the Medal "For Valiant Labour in the Great Patriotic War 1941-1945".  If worn in the presence of awards of the Russian Federation, the latter have precedence.  Each medal came with an attestation of award, this attestation came in the form of a small 8 cm by 11 cm cardboard booklet bearing the award's name, the recipient's particulars and an official stamp and signature on the inside.

Medal description
The Medal "Veteran of Labour" was designed by artist SA Pomansky.  It was a 34 mm in diameter circular medal struck from tombac and then silver-plated and oxidised.  The obverse of the medal bears the relief image of the hammer and sickle over the inscription "USSR" with diverging rays, a laurel branch spans the width of the obverse from right to left passing under the sickle's handle in an upward curve, along the lower and right circumference, a ribbon bearing the relief inscription "VETERAN OF LABOUR".  The otherwise plain reverse bears the inscription on four lines "FOR LONG DILIGENT WORK". 
  
The Medal "Veteran of Labour" was secured by a ring through the medal suspension loop to a standard Soviet pentagonal mount covered by a 24mm wide overlapping silk moiré ribbon with 1 mm wide white edge stripes and coloured from left to right by a 7 mm wide dark grey stripe, an 8 mm wide light grey stripe, and three 2 mm wide red stripes separated by two 0.5 mm wide white stripes.

Apparently, there is a variation of the medal, being struck in silver as opposed to tombac, but this has not yet been verified.

Recipients (partial list)
The individuals below were all recipients of the Medal "Veteran of Labour".

 Test pilot Yury Garrievich Abramovich
 Poet and bard Evgeny Danilovich Agranovich
 Sculptor Zair Isaakovich Azgur
 Painter and architect Valery Vladimirovich Androsov
 Engineer Sergey Aleksandrovich Afanasyev
 Economist Sopubek Begaliev
 Aero engine engineer Vyacheslav Aleksandrovich Boguslayev
 Actress Elina Avraamovna Bystritskaya
 Stage and a film actor Yevgeny Yakovlevich Vesnik
 Rocket engine designer Valentin Petrovich Glushko
 Rocket scientist Peter Dmitrievich Grushin
 Mezzo-soprano singer Zara Aleksandrova Dolukhanova
 Actor and writer Georgiy Stepanovich Zhzhonov
 Theatre and cinema actor Vladimir Mikhailovich Zeldin
 Former Prime Minister of Russia Viktor Alekseyevich Zubkov
 Folk singer Lyudmila Georgievna Zykina
 Singer Iosif Davydovich Kobzon
 People's Artist of the USSR composer Quddus Khodzham'iarovich Kuzhamiyarov
 Director of civil aviation Nikolai Alexeyevich Kuznetsov
 Gymnast and Olympic medalist Larisa Semyonovna Latynina
 Ballerina Olga Vasilyevna Lepeshinskaya
 Actress Nina Evgen'evna Menshikova
 Historian Georg Vasilievich Myasnikov
 Professor of Neurology Taisiya Sergeevna Osintseva
 Film and television actor Viktor Pavlovich Pavlov
 Scientist and optics engineer Vladimir Nikolayevich Polukhin
 Twice Hero of the Soviet Union fighter pilot Vitaly Ivanovich Popkov
  Soviet Russian lawyer, criminologist Vladimir Vasilevich Pankratov
 Physicist Alexander Mikhaylovich Prokhorov
 Comic actor Mikhail Ivanovich Pugovkin
 Former Ukrainian Prime Minister Valeriy Pustovoitenko
 Actor Yevgeny Valerianovich Samoilov
 Football player Nikita Pavlovic Simonyan
 Museum director Lyudmila Andreevna Sorokina
 Master builder Zukhra Valeeva
 Historian Valentin Lavrentievich Yanin
 Composer and pianist Yakhin Rustem Mukhamet-Khazeyevich
  Markiel Yagudayevich Gavrielov

See also

 Orders, decorations, and medals of the Soviet Union
 Badges and Decorations of the Soviet Union

References

External links
 Legal Library of the Soviet Union

Civil awards and decorations of the Soviet Union
Awards established in 1974
Awards disestablished in 1991
1991 disestablishments in the Soviet Union
1974 establishments in the Soviet Union